Shattuck is a town in Ellis County, Oklahoma, United States. The population was 1,356 at the 2010 census.

History
Shattuck is located in what was once the Cherokee Outlet. The Southern Kansas Railway built a railroad through the area in 1887, and there was a railroad water station called "Norice" on the site that later became Shattuck. Non-Indian settlers first arrived in the Land Run of 1893. Around the railroad station, new businesses opened to support the farmers, including a blacksmith shop, a store, a school, and a post office. The post office, which was incorporated in November 1893, was named Shattuck after a Santa Fe Railroad director. The town site was plotted 1901, and the town was incorporated in 1906.

On May 25, 2021, an earthquake magnitude 4.1 on the Richter Scale occurred a few miles west of Shattuck, despite it not being an area known for earthquakes.

Geography
Shattuck is located west of the center of Ellis County at  (36.272596, -99.876217). U.S. Route 283 passes through the center of town, leading north  to Laverne and south  to Arnett, the Ellis county seat. Oklahoma State Highway 15 passes through the southeast part of Shattuck, leading northeast  to Woodward.

Demographics

As of the census of 2000, there were 1,274 people, 567 households, and 369 families residing in the town. There were 699 housing units at an average density of 483.1 per square mile (186.1/km2). The racial makeup of the town was 95.76% White, 1.57% Native American, 0.86% from other races, and 1.81% from two or more races. Hispanic or Latino of any race were 3.85% of the population.

There were 567 households, out of which 23.3% had children under the age of 18 living with them, 55.9% were married couples living together, 7.6% had a female householder with no husband present, and 34.9% were non-families. 33.2% of all households were made up of individuals, and 19.0% had someone living alone who was 65 years of age or older. The average household size was 2.16 and the average family size was 2.74.

In the town, the population was spread out, with 20.0% under the age of 18, 6.1% from 18 to 24, 20.4% from 25 to 44, 28.3% from 45 to 64, and 25.1% who were 65 years of age or older. The median age was 47 years. For every 100 females, there were 88.2 males. For every 100 females age 18 and over, there were 81.3 males.

The median income for a household in the town was $26,758, and the median income for a family was $35,250. Males had a median income of $32,375 versus $18,077 for females. The per capita income for the town was $17,420. About 7.5% of families and 10.2% of the population were below the poverty line, including 11.7% of those under age 18 and 12.7% of those age 65 or over.

Parks, recreation and attractions
City Park has playground equipment, tennis courts, covered picnic facilities, and a mile-long Lighted Walking Trail at Centennial Lake.  It also has Shattuck Public Swimming Pool.

The municipal/semi-private Shattuck Golf and Country Club has nine holes and was built in 1950.

Gage Beach, Oklahoma’s largest outdoor swimming pool, is seven miles east of Shattuck; the spring-fed waters of this 100-year-old pool are mineral-rich.

Lake Lloyd Vincent and the Ellis County Wildlife Management Area are well south of town, but in Shattuck’s zip code.

The Shattuck Windmill Museum has a large number of vintage windmills, as well as versions of some early settler buildings.

 
The following locations are NRHP-listed:

Shattuck National Bank Building was built in 1910, with a second floor added in 1913. It became the Shattuck Public Library in 1963.  Wall murals inside the building depict the history of Shattuck from 1838 to the present.

The Ingle Brothers Broomcorn Warehouse was built in 1909, and is a gable-front brick building with a stepped gable.

References

External links
 Town of Shattuck official website
 Shattuck Chamber of Commerce
 Encyclopedia of Oklahoma History & Culture
 Shattuck Windmill Museum & Park

Towns in Ellis County, Oklahoma
Towns in Oklahoma